Penicillium nodositatum is an anamorph, biverticillate species of the genus Penicillium which induce the growth of the myconodules in the species Alnus incana.

References

Further reading 
 
 
 
 
 

nodositatum
Fungi described in 1989